Caution to the Wind may refer to:

Albums
Caution to the Wind, a 1988 album by Sherman Andrus
Caution to the Wind, a 1995 album by Pura Fé
Caution to the Wind, a 2000 album by Phil Cohen and Patricia Ford, see Jon Shain

Songs
"Caution to the Wind", a 1994 song by Elastic, now known as Euphoria
"Caution to the Wind", a 2008 song by Anti-Flag from The Bright Lights of America
"Caution to the Wind", a 2013 song by Becky Hill
"Caution to the Wind", a song by GrooveLily from Striking 12